The Belice, is a river of western Sicily. The Belice proper then flows for another  or so before entering the  Strait of Sicily to the east of the ancient Greek archaeological site of Selinunte. During Classical times it was known as the Hypsas.

History
The middle section of the Belice valley was hit by the January 1968 Belice earthquake which completely destroyed numerous centres of population, including Gibellina, Montevago and Salaparuta. Three hundred and seventy people died, a thousand were injured and some 70,000 people were made homeless.

References

Rivers of Italy
Rivers of Sicily
Rivers of the Province of Palermo
Rivers of the Province of Trapani
European drainage basins of the Mediterranean Sea